Steve, Steven or Stephen George may refer to:
Steve George (American football) (born 1951), American football player
Steve George (keyboardist) (born 1955), keyboardist for pop band Mr. Mister
Steve George, bassist for Swervedriver
Steve George, fictional character on Australian soap opera Neighbours
Stephen George (musician), drummer with Ministry
Stephen George (politician), Indian politician
Stephen R. George, Canadian author
 Steven George (born 1982), Australian Paralympic tandem cycling pilot
 Steven M. George, American physicist

See also